Kotlarka may refer to the following villages in:

Poland 
Kotlarka, Lower Silesian Voivodeship (south-west Poland)
Kotlarka, Masovian Voivodeship (east-central Poland)

Ukraine 
 Kotliarka, the Popilnia Raion of the Zhytomyr Oblast, the historical region Right-bank Ukraine